Chris Foote (born 19 November 1950) is an English former footballer who played in the Football League for Bournemouth and Cambridge United.

External links
 

English footballers
English Football League players
1950 births
Living people
AFC Bournemouth players
Cambridge United F.C. players
Weymouth F.C. players
Footballers from Bournemouth
Association football midfielders